The Seal River is a river in the borough of Yakutat in Alaska, United States. It is part of the Pacific Ocean drainage basin, and is a tributary of the Gulf of Alaska.

The river begins at Vitus Lake, which takes in meltwater from mouth of the Bering Glacier, and flows southwest to the Gulf of Alaska.

See also
List of rivers of Alaska

References

Rivers of Alaska
Rivers of Yakutat City and Borough, Alaska